Phyllocnistis pharetrucha is a moth of the family Gracillariidae. It is known from South Africa.

References

Phyllocnistis
Endemic moths of South Africa